Toshinori Ishikuma (born September 1950) is a Japanese psychologist. He is known for his work on introducing and establishing the system of school psychology services in Japan, and his expert guidance and training in chosen students for psychology He was among key psychologists who started certifying school psychologists in Japan in 1997. He is also famous for development of individual intelligence tests such as the Japanese versions of Kaufman Assessment Battery for Children, Kaufman Assessment Battery for Children-Second Edition, and Japanese versions of Wechsler Intelligence Scale for Children -III and IV, as well as Wechsler Adult Intelligence Scale,- IV. He is now working to produce the Japanese version of Wechsler Intelligence Scale for Children -V. He was also among important members of movement toward "Certified Public Psychologist Bill", which was passed in 2015.

Early life and career 

Born in Yamaguchi Prefecture, Japan, Ishikuma earned his bachelor's degree from University of Montevallo in 1985; M.A. in Educational Psychology from University of Alabama in 1986; and Ph.D. from University of Alabama in 1990 (under Alan S. Kaufman), specializing in School Psychology. He learned about psychological services with a focus on each child's strengths in intelligence and a philosophy of intelligent testing from Alan S. Kaufman and his wife, Nadeen L. Kaufman.

While Lecturer at San Diego State University (1989-1990), he worked with Carol Robinson-Zañartu, Valerie J. Cook-Morales, and Colette Ingraham. He was influenced by them and learned the assessment and services for children within the environmental and multicultural context and by integration with ecological processes. For his interests in Rational Emotive Therapy (RET) in Counseling, he had an opportunity to be supervised by Albert Ellis. From Ellis, he learned how to serve people with focuses on resolving cognitive, emotional and behavioral problems and disturbances and enabling people to lead happier and more fulfilling lives. He applies and revised the RET to be useful and effective for Japanese clients by integrating RET with humanistic approaches.

He is certified as Supervisor for both of School Psychologist and Special Education Needs Specialist in Japan. He is a member of several expert working groups for Ministry of Education, Culture, Sports, Science and Technology (MEXT) and academic associations such as the President of Japanese School Psychology Association (JSPA) and Japanese Association of School Psychologists (JASP). He was vice president and executive director of the University of Tsukuba and superintendent of Education Bureau of the University of Tsukuba Laboratory Schools. Currently, he is Professor of Psychology and Dean of Graduate School of Psychology at Tokyo Seitoku University.

He has been providing psychological support for children in the affected areas by The Great East Japan earthquake as a coordinator for Child and School Support Team in the Japanese Association of School Psychologists, as well as a leader of Psychological Support Team for Children in Fukushima Educational Board. For this tremendous work, he was awarded "President's Award to Outstanding Contribution" from National Association of School Psychologists in 2012.

Awards and honors 
 President's Award to Outstanding Contribution, National Association of School Psychologists (2012)
 Outstanding Article Award, with S. Tamura, Japanese Association of Educational Psychology (2004)
 Most Outstanding Student Award, College of Education, The University of Alabama (1989)
 Outstanding Research Award, Second Place, with A. S. Kaufman, J.M. McLean and S. Moon, Mid-South Educational Research Association Conference (1987)
 Outstanding Teaching Assistant Award, College of Education, The University of Alabama (1987)
 Successive Approximation Award in Psychology, University of Montevallo (1985)
 Outstanding International Student Award, Gadsden State Junior College (1983)

In 2013, for memorizing his contribution in the field of school psychology for years, "Toshinori Ishikuma School Psychology Award", named after him was established in Japanese School Psychology Association (JSPA).

Professional associations 
 National Association of School Psychologists
 
 International School Psychology Association 
 
 Japanese School Psychology Association (president)
 
 Japanese Association of School Psychologists (on the board of directors) 

 Organization of Certifying and Managing School Psychologist (president)

 School Counseling Association (president)
 
 Japanese Association of Educational Psychology 

 Japanese Academy of Learning Disabilities (on the board of directors)
 
 Japanese Union of Psychological Associations (vice president)

  Japanese Association of Certified Public Psychologists (vice president)

Development of intelligence scales 

Kaufman, A.S; Kaufman, N.L.; Fujita, K.; Ishikuma, T.; Aoyama, S.; Hattori, T.; Kumagai, K.;Ono, J. (2013)  Japanese version of K-ABC－II Maruzenn 

Wechsler, D.; Uemo,K.; Ishikuma, T; Dairoku, K.; Matsuda,.; Yamanaka, K. (2018)  Japanese Wechsler Intelligence Scale. Nihon Bunka Kagakusha

Major publications in Japanese

Publications in English

External links 
 Toshinori Ishikuma Official Webpage
 University of Tsukuba Official Webpage
 Ishikuma Toshinori, TRIOS (Researcher List), University of Tsukuba

References 

1950 births
Living people
Child psychologists
Japanese psychologists
University of Alabama alumni
University of Montevallo alumni
Academic staff of the University of Tsukuba